Michael Osei may refer to:
 Michael Kwasi Osei, Ghanaian politician
 Michael Osei (footballer, born 1971), Ghanaian footballer and coach
 Michael Osei (footballer, born 1982)
 Michael Osei (footballer, born 2004)